Cecília Menezes de Souza (born 1 February 1982) is a Brazilian indoor volleyball player.

She was part of the Brazil women's national volleyball team at the 2002 FIVB Volleyball Women's World Championship in Germany.

In clubs, she played for E. C. Pinheiros, and won a bronze medal at the 2007 Salonas Cup International Tournament.

References

External links
Profile, FIVB
http://www.amovoleibol.com.br/AtletaDetalhe/21/566/2016/superliga-feminina/cecilia-menezes-de-souza-cica-/

1982 births
Living people
Brazilian women's volleyball players
Place of birth missing (living people)
Middle blockers